Henry Heyes (born 1895) was an English professional association footballer who played as a goalkeeper. He played 26 matches in the Football League Third Division North for Nelson in the 1921–22 season. He also had spells in non-league football with Chorley, Coppull and Horwich RMI.

References

1895 births
People from Aspull
English footballers
Association football goalkeepers
Chorley F.C. players
Nelson F.C. players
Year of death missing